Michael Garrison may refer to:
 Michael Garrison (musician) (1956–2004), synthesist
 Michael Garrison (politician), former president of West Virginia University
 Michael Garrison (producer) (1922–1966), creator of the television series The Wild Wild West
 J. Michael Garrison, Episcopal bishop